Deadfall Creek is a stream in North Slope Borough, Alaska, in the United States. It is a tributary of the Kukpowruk River

Deadfall Creek was named for a stone deadfall trap set by Eskimos near its mouth.

See also
 List of rivers of Alaska

References

Rivers of North Slope Borough, Alaska
Rivers of Alaska